Richard William Elviss (born 19 July 1945) is an English former first-class cricketer.

Elviss was born at the Sheffield suburb of Fulwood in July 1945. He later studied at Trinity College, Oxford where he played first-class cricket for Oxford University. He made his debut against Gloucestershire at Oxford in 1966, with Elviss playing first-class cricket for Oxford until 1967, making nineteen appearances. Playing as right-arm off break bowler, he took 65 wickets at an average of 26.43. He claimed a five wicket haul on four occasions and had best figures of 5 for 83. On the back of strong performances for Oxford, he played a trial match with the Yorkshire Second XI in the 1966 Minor Counties Championship.

References

External links

1945 births
Living people
People from Fulwood, Sheffield
Alumni of Trinity College, Oxford
English cricketers
Oxford University cricketers
Cricketers from Sheffield